Air Force Island is an uninhabited island in the Qikiqtaaluk Region of Nunavut, Canada. It is located along the southwestern coast of Baffin Island and measures  in size.

The first written record of the island's existence was in 1948, as were neighbouring Prince Charles Island and Foley Island, by a Royal Canadian Air Force (RCAF) crew member, Albert-Ernest Tomkinson, navigating an Avro Lancaster. The island was named in recognition of the RCAF's role in surveying the Arctic Archipelago.

References

 Sea islands: Atlas of Canada; Natural Resources Canada

Islands of Foxe Basin
Uninhabited islands of Qikiqtaaluk Region